Said Makapu (born 4 January 1996) is a Tanzanian football midfielder who plays for Young Africans.

References

1996 births
Living people
Tanzanian footballers
Tanzania international footballers
Young Africans S.C. players
Association football midfielders
Tanzanian Premier League players